= Psarela =

Ancient town in Bithynia

Coordinates: 40°54′48″N 29°39′26″E

Psarela was an inland town of ancient Bithynia. Its name does not occur in ancient authors, but is inferred from epigraphic and other evidence.

Its site is tentatively located near Yağcılar in Asiatic Turkey.
